Panipat Refinery is an oil refinery located in Baholi, Panipat, Haryana, India. It was set up in 1998. Panipat Refinery is the seventh refinery belonging to Indian Oil Corporation Limited. It is one of South Asia's largest integrated petrochemicals plants. Panipat Refinery meets the demand of petroleum products of Haryana and of the entire North-West Region including Punjab, J&K, Himachal, Chandigarh, Uttaranchal state and part of Rajasthan & Delhi. It stands by Indian Oil vision to become a major, diversified, transnational, integrated energy company, with national leadership and a strong environment conscience, playing national role in oil security and public distribution. Bedgsing younger of the Indian Oil refineries it houses latest refining technologies from Axens; France, Haldor-Topsoe; Denmark, UOP; USA, Stone & Webster; USA and Delta Hudson-Canada, Dupont, USA and ABB Luumas. The original cost of the refinery's construction was Rs 3868 Crores.  It commenced with a capacity of 6 million tonnes per year and has been recently augmented to 12 million tonnes per year at a cost of Rs 4165 Crores. The refinery is designed to handle both indigenous and imported crudes. It receives crude through the Salaya Mathura Pipeline which also supplies crude to Mathura and Baroda refineries.

Refining units
In addition to crude and vacuum distillation units, the major refining units are catalytic reforming unit, once-through Hydrocracker unit, Resid Fluidised Catalytic Cracking unit, visbreaker unit, delayed coking unit, bitumen blowing unit, hydrogen generation unit, sulphur block and associated auxiliary facilities. In order to produce low sulphur diesel, a Diesel Hydro Desulphurisation Unit (DHDS) was commissioned in 1999.

Petrochemical units
The refinery also houses PX-PTA units which were commissioned in June 2006. They produce paraxylene and PTA. PTA is a useful raw material for producing other commercial polymers. It produces Benzene as one of the by products.

Expanding its presence in petrochemical space, Indian Oil has commissioned a Naphtha Cracker Complex adjacent to Panipat refinery complex at a project cost of Rs 14439 Crores. It produces ethylene and propylene, which are further used to produce polymers like polypropylene, low/high-density polyethylene and monoethylene glycol

Panipat Refinery has been further augmented with an additional capacity of 3 million tonnes per year, taking the total capacity to 15 million tonnes per year. With Euro VI/BS 6 norms in place, Panipat Refinery is a large contributor of ultra low sulphur diesel for Indian Oil.

Highlights
The refinery's highlights include:
 Zero discharge of effluent gases
 The presence of four ambient air monitoring stations that were in place well before the refinery was in use
 It is an eco-friendly refinery, as indicated by a green belt outside it
 The establishment of a totally electronic-based communication system within the refinery
 It has the lowest manpower of all refineries in the region with similar capacities

Quality certifications
Panipat Refinery holds several quality certifications from DNV, including:
 ISO 9002
 ISO 14001
 OHSAS 18001

References

Oil refineries in India
Energy in Haryana
Panipat
Indian Oil Corporation
Companies based in Haryana
Indian Oil Corporation buildings and structures
1998 establishments in Haryana
Energy infrastructure completed in 1998
20th-century architecture in India